Aria Khorramdarreh Zanjan Football Club is an Iranian football club based in Zanjan, Iran. They currently compete in the 3rd Division.

Season-by-Season

The table below shows the achievements of the club in various competitions.

See also
 2011–12 Hazfi Cup

Football clubs in Iran
Association football clubs established in 2006
2006 establishments in Iran